Bae Il-hwan (born 20 July 1988) is a retired South Korean footballer who played as a forward.

Club career
He joined Jeju United FC in 2011. He scored his first goal at opening match of K-League 2012 against Incheon United.

Club career statistics

External links 

1988 births
Living people
Association football forwards
South Korean footballers
Jeju United FC players
Gimcheon Sangmu FC players
K League 1 players
K League 2 players
Dankook University alumni